Pseudargyrochlamys is a genus of fly in the family Dolichopodidae. It was established by Igor Grichanov in 2006, for four species of Paracleius (now a synonym of Pelastoneurus) from South Africa. A fifth species was described in 2020.

Species
The genus includes five species:
Pseudargyrochlamys barracloughi (Grichanov, 2004)
Pseudargyrochlamys jasoni (Grichanov, 2004)
Pseudargyrochlamys londti Grichanov, 2020
Pseudargyrochlamys michaeli (Grichanov, 2004)
Pseudargyrochlamys umngazi (Grichanov, 2004)

References

Dolichopodinae
Dolichopodidae genera
Diptera of Africa